Revelation is a three-episode, Australian documentary series directed by Nial Fulton and Sarah Ferguson. The series was broadcast on ABC Television in March 2020. In a world television first, Fulton and Ferguson took cameras into the criminal trials of Catholic priests accused of sex crimes against children and interviewed Father Vincent Ryan and Brother Bernard McGrath, two of the most prolific child sex abusers in Australia. 

The final episode looks at the systemic cover-up of child sexual abuse in the Diocese of Ballarat and features allegations of child sexual abuse against Cardinal George Pell.

Synopsis

Series Synopsis

Revelation follows the criminal trials of Father Vincent Ryan and Brother Bernard McGrath, Catholic priests accused of sex crimes against children. Ryan and McGrath reveal the secret lives and motivations of some of the most reviled men of modern times.

The third episode examines the culture and system that protected perpetrators in Ballarat, the epicentre of clerical abuse in Australia. Two men, former residents of an orphanage in Ballarat, make allegations against Australia's most senior Catholic, Cardinal George Pell. Steve Blacker, an altar-boy who was raped by notorious paedophile Father Gerald Ridsdale, launches a landmark lawsuit against the Catholic Church. 

Episode 1 - The Children Have Been Used By The Devil

One of the Catholic Church’s first paedophile priests to be convicted anywhere in the world, Father Vincent Ryan faces new criminal charges. In a world television first, the series films the trial of a clerical child abuser as Ryan’s victims search desperately for justice. On the eve of trial, Sarah Ferguson confronts Ryan about his double life and prolific offending. Ryan reveals how he used confession and the brotherhood of the clergy to conceal his crimes. Marked out by his superiors as a future prince of the church, Ryan was sent to study in Rome. Ordained by the Pope in St. Peter’s Basilica, Ryan describes how the Church instructed him to believe he was untouchable.

Police open the files of the original investigation into Vincent Ryan, revealing how he was moved from parish to parish, sexually abusing children everywhere he was sent. Ryan’s defense is challenged by his victims, who describe the terror and shame he inflicted on them. The episode reveals that despite multiple convictions and decades as a known paedophile, Vincent Ryan is still a Catholic priest.

Episode 2 - A Dangerous Place To Be A Child

A beachside city on the New South Wales coast, Newcastle has one of the highest concentrations of child abusers of any Catholic diocese in the world. The trial of local priest Father Vincent Ryan continues, revealing the system responsible for the cover-up of his crimes. Ryan’s former house-keeper, 93-year-old Audrey Nash, describes the night her son Andrew hanged himself. His abuser, a Marist Brother, arrived at the house in a desperate bid to cover his tracks, looking for Andrew’s suicide note.

As the trial for Ryan reaches its verdict, another Catholic sex abuse trial gets underway. Bernard McGrath, a religious brother from the Order of St John of God, terrified his victims in a residential boarding school where he was headmaster. During the trial, Sarah Ferguson goes into the maximum-security prison to interview McGrath. In a tense exchange, McGrath names the individuals who enabled his abuse of children over decades, moving him from New Zealand to Australia and the United States.

McGrath’s prison confession leads to senior Church official Father Brian Lucas, one of the architects of the Church cover-up of child abuse. The episode ends with the revelation that the Brothers responsible for moving McGrath are still under the protection of the Pope.

Episode 3 - Goliath

Cardinal George Pell is one of the Pope’s closest advisors and a divisive figure in Australia. Bernie breaks decades of silence saying Pell groomed and abused him in the Ballarat orphanage where he grew up, in a swimming pool and the presbytery of the Catholic cathedral in the 1970s. Bernie had kept his secret hidden for decades, intimidated by Pell’s growing power and authority in the church.

An investigation unfolds in the remote parishes of the vast outback of Victoria, searching for evidence of Bernie and Pell’s parallel histories. Former residents of the orphanage come forward, some with their own stories of abuse. Ballarat priests talk about the institutional cover-up of pedophilia in their church. 

Steve Blacker tells how his parish priest, Father Gerald Ridsdale, raped him in the confessional. Steve brings a civil case against the church, which results in a landmark decision for victims of clerical abuse. Bernie has the final word, asking for the shame he and other victims have carried for decades to be taken away.

Production
The series was produced by In Films for the Australian Broadcasting Corporation and was shot in the Vatican, Ireland, New Zealand and multiple locations around Australia, including the Catholic dioceses of Ballarat and Maitland-Newcastle.

Following lengthy negotiations, the producers were granted permission to bring cameras into the New South Wales District Court to film the 2019 child sex abuse criminal trials of Father Vincent Ryan and Brother Bernard McGrath. Ryan's trial was filmed over six weeks and McGrath's over seven months. It was the first time anywhere in the world that cameras had been allowed into a clerical child abuse trial. Both Ryan and McGrath consented to their trials being recorded for the series.

In another television first, NSW Corrective Services granted permission for a four-person film crew to enter a maximum security prison to interview Bernard McGrath, a former member of the Hospitaller Order of St. John of God religious order. McGrath is serving a 39-year prison sentence for multiple sex offenses against young boys under his care in Kendall Grange, New South Wales.

Broadcast

 Episode 1 was broadcast on 17 March 2020 on ABC TV and achieved a combined (broadcast and online) audience of 885K and an iView audience of 979,000.
 Episode 2 was postponed due to live coverage of the Prime Minister's televised address to the nation regarding the COVID-19 pandemic and went to air on 31 March. It achieved a combined audience of 904,000.
 Episode 3 was screened on 2 April and achieved a combined audience of 714,000.

The series will steam on Netflix from 22 March 2023.

Key people
 Sarah Ferguson - presenter

Episode 1: "The Children have been used by the Devil"
 Vincent Ryan - convicted priest, Roman Catholic Diocese of Maitland-Newcastle
 Gerard McDonald - victim of Vincent Ryan
 Peter Dorn - victim of Vincent Ryan
 Scott Hallett - victim of Vincent Ryan
 Bill Burston - Catholic priest, Roman Catholic Diocese of Maitland-Newcastle
 Troy Grant - former police officer
 Michael King - Vincent Ryan's barrister
 David Patch - Crown prosecutor, Ryan 2019 trial 
 William Wright - Roman Catholic Diocese of Maitland-Newcastle
 Dina Yehia - judge, NSW District Court 
 Mary McAleese - former President of Ireland
 Colm O'Gorman - Irish survivor of clerical abuse

Episode 2: "A Dangerous Place to be a Child"

 Vincent Ryan - convicted Catholic priest, Roman Catholic Diocese of Maitland-Newcastle
 Audrey Nash - former friend of Vincent Ryan, mother of Andrew Nash
 Andrew Nash (archive) - schoolboy who took his own life following sexual abuse
 Geoffrey Nash - Andrew Nash's older brother
 Bernard McGrath - convicted brother, Hospitaller Order of St. John of God
 Leo Clarke (archive) - bishop, Roman Catholic Diocese of Maitland-Newcastle
 Patrick Cotter (archive) - priest, Roman Catholic Diocese of Maitland-Newcastle
 Paul Andreassen - victim of Bernard McGrath
 Jason Van Dyke - victim of Bernard McGrath
 Paul - victim of Bernard McGrath
 Phil Hogan - Crown prosecutor, McGrath 2019 trial
 Gina O'Rourke - judge, NSW District Court
 Sean Buckley - former New Zealand detective
 Michelle Mulvihill - former psychologist, Hospitaller Order of St. John of God
 Kristi Faber - detective sergeant, NSW Police 
 William Wright - current bishop of Roman Catholic Diocese of Maitland-Newcastle
 Bill Burston - Catholic priest, Roman Catholic Diocese of Maitland-Newcastle
 Brian Lucas - Catholic priest
 Maurice Cahill - Catholic priest, Roman Catholic Diocese of Maitland-Newcastle
 Diarmuid Martin - Archbishop of Dublin, Ireland
 Mary McAleese - former President of Ireland
 Colm O'Gorman - Irish survivor of clerical abuse
 Joanne McCarthy - journalist

Episode 3: - "Goliath"

 Bernie - former resident, Nazareth House Boys Home, Ballarat
 Peter Clarke - former resident, Nazareth House Boys Home, Ballarat
 Albert Azzopardi - former resident, Nazareth House Boys Home, Ballarat
 Philip Clarke - former resident, Nazareth House Boys Home, Ballarat
 Steve Blacker - victim of Father Gerald Ridsdale
 Shirley Ridsdale - sister of Father Gerald Ridsdale
 Viv Waller - lawyer, Melbourne
 Judy Courtin - lawyer, Melbourne
 William Melican - Catholic priest, Diocese of Ballarat
 Eric Bryant - Catholic priest, Diocese of Ballarat
 George Pell (archive) - cardinal
 Charles Scicluna - Archbishop of Malta
 Mark Coleridge - Archbishop of Brisbane, Australia
 David Marr - journalist
 Peter McClellan - chair, Royal Commission into Institutional Responses to Child Sexual Abuse
 Steve Bannon - political strategist
 Mary McAleese - former President of Ireland
 Peter Saunders - British victim's advocate
 David O'Brien - barrister, Melbourne

Episodes

Reception

Critical response
The series met with positive reviews. Holly Byrnes of The Daily Telegraph (Sydney) wrote that "Walkley award-winning journalist Sarah Ferguson has delivered some of the best TV journalism this country has ever witnessed, but Revelation might just be the pinnacle." Bridget McManus from The Age (Melbourne) gave it a four out of five star rating, calling it a "searing documentary series". Brigid Delaney, a senior writer for the Guardian Australia, wrote "You'll need a strong stomach to digest Revelation's insights into child sexual abuse in the Catholic church."

In The Australian, Graeme Blundell wrote that "although it is often difficult to watch, Ferguson and her exemplary production team, including executive producer Nial Fulton, principal cinematographer Aaron Smith and researchers Sophie Randerson, Kate Wild, and Alison McClymont, have been able to shed light not only on their heinous atrocities but how the Catholic Church repeatedly chose secrecy over transparency and accountability. It is a confronting, awful study of a church that not only fell to decay but seems beyond renewal, achingly absent of integrity and grace." Blundell also praises Ferguson for her restraint, saying that "the interviews she conducts, initially with Ryan and later with Bernard McGrath, a former St John of God brother, teacher and headmaster in residential schools in Australia and New Zealand, serving 39 years for crimes against children, are harrowing and disturbing as she provokes and exposes a web of conspiracy and perversion. She tries to display no explicit emotion as she questions Ryan but can only just conceal her ethical disgust behind that journalistic veneer of taut self-control."

The series won the Walkley Documentary Award on 20 November 2020. The judges' citation read: "This haunting documentary broke new ground on an issue already well covered by the media and investigated by police and the Royal Commission alike. The extraordinary access to some of the Catholic Church’s most notorious perpetrators of sexual abuse against children, as well as the insight it gave viewers into court proceedings, showed just how powerful journalistic documentary-making can be."

In December 2020, Revelation won Best Documentary Series at the Asian Academy Creative Awards.

Controversy

On 7 April 2020, Cardinal George Pell was released from prison and had his convictions for child sexual abuse overturned. In response, the producers took the decision to include footage of Pell's release. No material from the original broadcast was removed or altered. 

In a statement, Cardinal Pell rejected the allegations made by Bernie and Peter Clarke in Revelation but following his acquittal, did not sue the producers or ABC television. Pell's release paved the way for the Royal Commission Into Institutional Responses to Child Sexual Abuse to release the previously redacted findings into what Pell knew about child sexual abuse in Victoria.

Andrew Bolt, a News Corp columnist and outspoken supporter of Pell, attacked the ABC and the filmmakers, saying the series was part of a "witch-hunt" against Pell. Following his acquittal, other vocal supporters of Pell, including Miranda Devine and Gerard Henderson, condemned those who had reported on the story. Numerous Newscorp journalists claimed that the ABC's reporting on the Pell case was one-sided and biased.

Greg Craven, the then vice-chancellor of the Australian Catholic University and a long-time friend of Pell, accused the ABC and police of "polluting" the legal atmosphere around the cardinal's Victorian trial. The ABC rejected Craven's allegations that the broadcaster had intentionally brought forward Episode 3 of Revelation in an attempt to influence the High Court.

The ABC responded to the News Corp claims, stating that "The ABC has always acted in the public interest in reporting on the police investigation into Cardinal George Pell and in investigating other allegations made against him. The ABC firmly rejects claims that it pursued a 'witch hunt' against Cardinal Pell, that it engaged in 'vigilante' journalism or that its coverage was one-sided or unfair."

Journalist Margaret Simmons also formed the view that the ABC's reporting on Pell did not "step over the line".

Awards and nominations

Response from the Catholic Church

Diocese of Maitland-Newcastle

The Diocese of Maitland-Newcastle responded to the imminent release of the series by issuing an open letter to their parishioners attempting to justify their failure to have convicted priest Father Vincent Ryan laicized. This was subsequently followed by a more detailed press release, including a timeline of Ryan's offending, Bishop Leo Clarke's failure to respond to Ryan's abuse, the treatment of the Nash family and Father William Burston. The report concluded that Ryan was "properly convicted" and that Andrew Nash "tragically committed suicide" after he was "abused by the criminal William Cable 'Br Romuald'". It was also claimed that the Congregation of the Doctrine of the Faith would recommend to Pope Francis that Ryan be laicised.

Following the broadcast, a plaque celebrating the life of Bishop Clarke was removed from the Maitland cathedral and an internal Catholic investigation was launched by Bishop Bill Wright regarding Father Burston's interview, who told Sarah Ferguson that he thought the suicide of 13-year-old Andrew Nash in 1974 was a "prank gone wrong".

Wright confirmed the internal investigation had concluded "some time ago" and that Burston had voluntarily agreed to no longer celebrate Mass or other church rituals. Audrey Nash had not been notified about the outcome of the investigation.

The Royal Commission Case Study 43 was released in October 2020 and found that Burston knew in 1976 that there had been a complaint of "sexually inappropriate behaviour" against Ryan.

Diocese of Ballarat

The Bishop of Ballarat, Paul Bird, issued a press release on 17 March 2020 warning parishioners that they might find some of the material in the show confronting and painful.

Brothers of St John of God

On 7 April 2020, the hospitaller order of the Brothers of St John of God posted a statement about the series on their website. The order did not deny the allegations that they had prior knowledge of Bernard McGrath's sexual offending against children under his care and moved him from Australia to New Zealand and later to the Jemez Springs treatment facility run by the Congregation of the Servants of the Paraclete in New Mexico, United States.

Archdiocese of Sydney

On 2 April 2020, the Archdiocese of Sydney responded to the allegations raised against Cardinal George Pell in episode 3 of the series by issuing a short press release.

See also
 Catholic sex abuse cases
 Mea Maxima Culpa: Silence in the House of God
 Spotlight (film)
 Deliver Us from Evil (2006 film)
 Holy Water-Gate 
 Twist of Faith

References

External links
 
 Revelation series website
 Revelation on ABC website
 In Films (production company) website

2020s Australian documentary television series
Catholic Church sexual abuse scandals in Ireland
Media coverage of Catholic Church sexual abuse scandals
Catholic Church sexual abuse scandals in Australia
True crime television series
Films about Catholic priests
Australian non-fiction television series
Documentary films about child abuse
English-language television shows